Handewitt was an Amt ("collective municipality") in the district of Schleswig-Flensburg, in Schleswig-Holstein, Germany. The seat of the Amt was the former municipality  Handewitt.

The Amt Handewitt consists of the following municipalities:

Handewitt
Jarplund-Weding

Former Ämter in Schleswig-Holstein